Bradford is a surname of Old English origin. It particularly refers to those from the City of Bradford, West Yorkshire formerly in the West Riding of Yorkshire.

 Arthur Bradford (born 1969), American writer and director
 Barbara Taylor Bradford (born 1933), British novelist
 Bill Bradford (footballer) (1903–1984), English footballer
 Bill Bradford (pitcher) (1921–2000), American baseball player, pitcher
 Buddy Bradford (born 1944), American baseball player, outfielder
 Carl Bradford (born 1992), American football player
 Carmen Bradford (born 1960), American jazz singer
 Chad Bradford (born 1974), baseball player, pitcher
 Chris Bradford (born 1974), writer, best known for Young Samurai series
Cornelia Bradford (disambiguation), several people
Cornelia Foster Bradford (1847-1935), American philanthropist and social reformer
Cornelia Smith Bradford (d. 1755), American printer and newspaper editor
 David Bradford (economist) (born 1939)
 David Bradford (lawyer) (born 1760)
 David Bradford (photographer) (born 1951)
 Dorothy Bradford (artist) (1918–2008), British painter 
 Dorothy Elizabeth Bradford (1897–1986), British painter 
 Edward Bradford (disambiguation), several people
 Edwin Emmanuel Bradford, priest, theologian, poet, and novelist
 Emantic Fitzgerald Bradford Jr. (1997–2018), victim of a police shooting in Hoover, Alabama
 Ernle Bradford (1922–1986), English historian and writer
 Francis Scott Bradford (1898-1961), American muralist
 Frank Bradford (1941-2022), American lawyer and politician
 Gamaliel Bradford (privateersman) (1768–1824), American privateersman
 Gamaliel Bradford (abolitionist) (1795–1839), American physician and abolitionist
 Gamaliel Bradford (biographer) (1863–1932), American biographer
 Geoff Bradford  (1927–1994), English footballer
 Geoff Bradford (musician) (born 1934) English blues musician
 George W. Bradford (1796–1883), New York politician
 Glenn Bradford (born 1947), Illinois politician and lawyer
 James Bradford (disambiguation), multiple people
 Jesse Bradford, American actor
 Joe Bradford (1901–1980), English footballer
 Joshua Taylor Bradford (1818–1871), American surgeon
 Leslie Bradford (1878–1943), Australian chemist, metallurgist and entrepreneur
 Lillie Mae Bradford (1928–2017), American civil rights activist
 Lynn Bradford, American football player
 Marion M. Bradford, American biochemist
 Mel Bradford (1934–1993), American literature professor
Michael Bradford (1965–), American playwright and artistic director
 Robert Bradford, Northern Irish footballer, Methodist minister and politician
 Roland Boys Bradford (1892–1917), British general
 Sam Bradford (born 1987), American football quarterback
 Samuel C. Bradford (1878–1948) British librarian and documentalist
 Sidney Bradford (1906–1960), recipient of a successful cornea transplant
 Vic Bradford, American baseball player and coach
  William Bradford (disambiguation), several people
 Wilmot Henry Bradford (1815–1914), British Army officer

See also 
 Bradford (disambiguation)
 Bradford (name)

References

English-language surnames
English toponymic surnames